Ada Band is an Indonesian pop rock band formed in Jakarta in 1996. The group currently consists of Indra Sinaga (vocals), Marshal Surya Rachman (guitars), Dika Satjadibrata (bass) & Adhy Pratama (drums).

Ada Band are known for their hit singles, such as "Manusia Bodoh", "Yang Terbaik Bagimu", "Masih", "Seharusnya", "Ough" & "Bilakah". The first album titled Seharusnya (Should), released in 1997. Their 2004 work, Heaven of Love, was the band's key seller, going quadruple platinum in their home nation.

Band members

Current members
 Indra Sinaga – lead vocals (2020–present; touring member 2019)
 Marshal S. Rachman – guitars (2002–present)
 Dika Satjadibrata – bass (1996–present)
 Adhy Pratama – drums (2010–present)

Former members
 Iso Eddy – keyboards (1996–2000)
 E'el (Elif Ritonga) – drums (1996–2000)
 Baim (Ibrahim Imran) – lead vocals, guitars (1996–2001)
 Rama Moektio – drums (2000–2004)
 Krishna Balagita – keyboards (1996–2008)
 Donnie Sibarani – lead vocals (2002–2017)

Discography

Studio albums

Compilation albums

Awards and nominations

|-
| rowspan="2"| 2006
| Romantic Rhapsody
| Indonesian Music Awards — Best of the Best Album
| 
|-
| ADA Band
| Indonesian Music Awards — Best Pop Duo/Group
| 
|-
| rowspan="2"| 2007
| "Surga Cinta"
| SCTV Awards — Famous Music Video
| 
|-
| ADA Band
| SCTV Awards — Famous Group Band
| 
|-
| 2011
| ADA Band
| Indonesian Music Awards — Best Pop Duo/Group
| 
|-
| rowspan="3"| 2014
| "Intim Berdua"
| Dahsyatnya Awards — Outstanding Song
| 
|-
| rowspan="2"| ADA Band
| Dahsyatnya Awards — Outstanding Band
| 
|-
| Dahsyatnya Awards — Outstanding Stage Act
| 
|-
| 2015
| ADA Band
| Dahsyatnya Awards — Outstanding Band
| 
|-
| 2017
| ADA Band
| Dahsyatnya Awards — Outstanding Band
| 
|}

References

External links 

 Official site
 ADA Band discography on Discogs
 ADA Band discography on iTunes

Musical groups established in 1996
Indonesian pop music groups
Indonesian rock music groups
1996 establishments in Indonesia
Pop rock groups